Al Jazeera Türk (AJT) was a news website in Turkish. It was owned by the Al Jazeera Media Network. Attempts to launch a television network do not appear to have succeeded.  The website was shut down on 3 May 2017.

Early background and first launch attempt
In February 2011, the Savings Deposit Insurance Fund of Turkey put Cine5 up for sale after the channel was confiscated when the owner Erol Aksoy went in debt and became bankrupt. Al Jazeera made a bid for the network and acquired it for $40.5 million after an unsuccessful $21 million bid. Al Jazeera then renamed the channel and is currently working on launching Al Jazeera Turkish.

In April 2012, there were reports of the channel being delayed over its refusal to call the Kurdistan Workers Party as "terrorists" as most Turkish news outlets do, citing journalistic standards. The Foreign Ministry, who advocated the project, became at odds with the channel. Vural Ak, a major Turkish investor, withdrew from the partnership with Al Jazeera. Nuh Yilmaz, head of Al Jazeera's Turkish editorial team, also resigned.

Digital online launch
Plans and efforts to launch the channel restarted in 2013 shortly after the launch of Al Jazeera America. On January 21, 2014, Al Jazeera Turk's website launched with news content. The move made Al Jazeera Turk the first 24-hour news operation to go digital before broadcast.

Like how the Al Jazeera English and Al Jazeera Balkans websites are designed similarly the Al Jazeera Turk site was designed similar to the Al Jazeera America site.

Also like its English, Arabic and Balkans counterparts the channel had its own digital Magazine.

Channel launch
The channel was under construction with plans to launch towards the end of 2014. Construction and indoor works were underway at the upcoming channel's building in Topkapı, İstanbul. The channel claimed its news center was built around the channel's regional vision.

Closure
On May 3, 2017, the Al Jazeera Media Network announced that it would shut down Al Jazeera Türk's digital operations.

See also

 International broadcasting
 Al Jazeera America
 Al Jazeera Balkans
 Al Jazeera English
 Al Jazeera
 AJ+

Competitors

CNN Türk
NTV (Turkey)
CNBC-e

References

External links
Official Website

Al Jazeera
Defunct websites
Turkish-language websites
Mass media in Istanbul